Mexicana Universal Ciudad de México is a pageant in Mexico City, Mexico, that selects that state's representative for the national Mexicana Universal pageant.

The state organization has produced two Nuestra Belleza Mundo México titleholders, in 1999 with Danette Velasco and  2004 with Dafne Molina.

Due to political reform in the Distrito Federal in late 2015, it changed its name officially to Ciudad de México, therefore, changing the state title "Nuestra Belleza Distrito Federal" to "Nuestra Belleza Ciudad de México", and days before the national final of Nuestra Belleza México 2015, the band's representative in this state was officially changed. In late 2017 the pageant changed the name to "Mexicana Universal Ciudad de México".

Mexicana Universal Ciudad de México is located at number 12 with two crowns of Nuestra Belleza Mexico.

Titleholders
Below are the names of the annual titleholders of Mexicana Universal Ciudad de México, listed in ascending order, and their final placements in the Mexicana Universal after their participation, until 2017 the names was Nuestra Belleza Ciudad de México.

 Competed in Miss Universe.
 Competed in Miss World.
 Competed in Miss International.
 Competed in Miss Charm International.
 Competed in Miss Continente Americano.
 Competed in Reina Hispanoamericana.
 Competed in Miss Orb International.
 Competed in Nuestra Latinoamericana Universal.

Designated Contestants
As of 2000, isn't uncommon for some States to have more than one delegate competing simultaneously in the national pageant. The following Nuestra Belleza Ciudad de México contestants were invited to compete in Nuestra Belleza México.

References

External links
 

Nuestra Belleza México